"The Walls" is a song by American R&B singer-songwriter Mario, featuring guest vocals from rapper American Fabolous. The song was released in the United States as a Digital download on September 23, 2011, as an intended single for Mario's fifth studio album but the song was scrapped in favor of new material.

Background
In an interview with Rap-Up TV, Mario revealed details on the new single and the album. Mario explained that the first single really pays homage to women who are comfortable with being sexy outside and they’re sexy with their men when they get home. This would be the last single that Mario released from the now-defunct J Records.

Track listing

Chart performance

Release history

References

2011 singles
Mario (singer) songs
Songs written by Rico Love
Songs written by Fabolous
J Records singles
2011 songs
Song recordings produced by Rico Love
Songs written by Mario (American singer)
Songs written by Pierre Medor